Keaton is an unincorporated community in Johnson County, Kentucky, United States. The community's first post office was established on May 17, 1900, with Sarah A Holbrook as the postmaster and it was named after the local Keaton family. Keaton's ZIP code is 41226.

Keaton is located at an elevation of 775 feet (227 m).

References

Unincorporated communities in Johnson County, Kentucky
Unincorporated communities in Kentucky